The black-eared ground thrush (Geokichla cameronensis) is a species of bird in the family Turdidae. It is found in Cameroon, Democratic Republic of the Congo, Equatorial Guinea, Gabon, and Uganda. Its natural habitats are subtropical or tropical moist lowland forests and subtropical or tropical moist montane forests.

The subspecies G. c. kibalensis of the Kibale Forest in western Uganda is sometimes regarded as a separate species, the Kibale ground-thrush.

References

black-eared ground thrush
Birds of Central Africa
black-eared ground thrush
Taxonomy articles created by Polbot